The Asphalt Jungle is a 1961 American police procedural television series starring Jack Warden, Arch Johnson, and Bill Smith about a squad of detectives targeting organized crime in the Midwestern United States. Inspired by the 1950 film The Asphalt Jungle, it aired from April 2 to June 25, 1961, on ABC.

The Asphalt Jungles pilot episode was re-edited and lengthened to create the 1961 theatrical film The Lawbreakers.

Synopsis

The police department's Metropolitan Squad specializes in fighting organized crime in an unnamed Midwestern city. The squads members are elite detectives led by Captain Gus Honochek and Sergeant Danny Keller. They report to Deputy Police Commissioner Matthew Gower. Many of their assignments involve going undercover, and Gower himself joins Honochek, Keller, and their squad in undercover work when the situation calls for it.

Cast
Jack Warden as Deputy Police Commissioner Matthew Gower
Arch Johnson as Captain Gus Honochek
Bill Smith as Sergeant Danny Keller

Production

The Asphalt Jungle was a gritty crime drama inspired by the 1950 film The Asphalt Jungle, which in turn was based on the 1949 novel The Asphalt Jungle by W. R. Burnett. The television series, however, had nothing in common with the novel or film other than its title – with the partial exception of the episode "The Professor," the plot of which reflects elements of the film.

Arthur Lewis, Mel Epstein, and Jaime del Valle produced episodes of the series, and Herman Hoffman, Gerald Mayer, and Joseph M. Newman directed the episodes. Burnett received a writing credit for each of the 13 episodes, and the other writers credited were George Bellak, Alvin Boretz, Steve Gethers, Abram S. Ginnes, John Huston, Ben Maddow, Paul Monash, E. Jack Neuman, Joseph Petracca, Adrian Spies, Peter Stone, Leon Tokatyan, Carey Wilber, and James Yaffe. Duke Ellington composed the shows music.  The television series was a Metro-Goldwyn-Mayer Television production and was filmed in black-and-white.

MGM Television filmed the pilot episode of The Asphalt Jungle, entitled "The Lady and the Lawyer", in 1960. It did not include Bill Smith or his Sergeant Danny Keller character; instead, the detective featured alongside Gower and Honochek was Sergeant Frank Orte, portrayed by Douglas Odney. For the rest of the series, Odneys Orte character was dropped, replaced by Smiths Keller character. ABC broadcast "The Lady and the Lawyer" on April 9, 1961, as the second episode of the series with the standard opening credits including Smith, although he does not appear in the episode, and Odney as Frank Orte credited in the closing credits.

After the cancellation of The Asphalt Jungle, "The Lady and the Lawyer" was re-edited and expanded to create the 79-minute 1961 theatrical film The Lawbreakers. Like "The Lady and the Lawyer," The Lawbreakers does not include Smith or his Keller character, so he is not credited in the film. David White, who portrays Police Commissioner James Deane in The Lawbreakers, also is credited for the role in the closing credits of "The Lady and the Lawyer", although neither he nor his Deane character appear in the television episode.  At the end of The Lawbreakers, Gower, a captain at the beginning of the film, is promoted to commissioner, not merely deputy commissioner.

Broadcast history

The Asphalt Jungle premiered on ABC on April 2, 1961. It had mediocre ratings and was cancelled after the broadcast of its 13th episode on June 25, 1961. It aired on Sunday at 9:30 pm throughout its run.

ABC aired reruns of The Asphalt Jungle in its regular time slot from July 2 to September 24, 1961.

Episodes

Sources

Notes

References

External links
 

1961 American television series debuts
1961 American television series endings
1960s American crime drama television series
1960s American police procedural television series
American Broadcasting Company original programming
Black-and-white American television shows
English-language television shows
Television series by MGM Television
Television shows set in the Midwestern United States